Juhani Manninen (born 4 May 1941) is a Finnish athlete. He competed in the men's long jump at the 1960 Summer Olympics.

References

1941 births
Living people
Athletes (track and field) at the 1960 Summer Olympics
Finnish male long jumpers
Olympic athletes of Finland
Place of birth missing (living people)